Amavi Agbobli-Atayi (born 25 December 1975) is a retired Togolese football defender. He was a squad member for the 1998 African Cup of Nations.

References

1975 births
Living people
Togolese footballers
Togo international footballers
OC Agaza players
Association football defenders
21st-century Togolese people